In mathematical set theory, Baumgartner's axiom (BA) can be one of three different axioms introduced by James Earl Baumgartner.

A subset of the real line is said to be -dense if every two points are separated by exactly  other points, where  is the smallest uncountable cardinality. This would be true for the real line itself under the continuum hypothesis. An axiom introduced by  states that all -dense subsets of the real line are order-isomorphic, providing a higher-cardinality analogue of Cantor's isomorphism theorem that countable dense subsets are isomorphic. Baumgartner's axiom is a consequence of the proper forcing axiom. It is consistent with a combination of ZFC, Martin's axiom, and the negation of the continuum hypothesis, but not implied by those hypotheses.

Another axiom introduced by  states that Martin's axiom for partially ordered sets MAP(κ) is true for all partially ordered sets P that are countable closed, well met and ℵ1-linked and all cardinals κ less than 2ℵ1.

A partial order (P, ≤) is said to satisfy axiom A if there is a family ≤n of partial orderings on P for n = 0, 1, 2, ... such that 
 ≤0 is the same as ≤
If p ≤n+1q then p ≤nq
If there is a sequence pn with pn+1 ≤n pn then there is a q with q ≤n pn for all n.
If I is a pairwise incompatible subset of P then for all p and for all natural numbers n there is a q such that q ≤n p and the number of elements of I compatible with q is countable.

References

Axioms of set theory